Shajapur Assembly constituency is one of the 230 Vidhan Sabha (Legislative Assembly) constituencies of Madhya Pradesh state in central India. It is a segment of Dewas (Lok Sabha constituency).

It is part of Shajapur District.

Vidhan Sabha Members

Election Details

1962 Vidhan Sabha Election
 Ramesh Chandra (JS) : 17,418 votes 
 Pratap Bhai (INC) : 14,163

2018 Vidhan Sabha Election
 Hukum Singh Karada (Congress) : 89,940 votes   
 Arun Bhimawad (BJP) : 44,961

See also
 Shajapur

References

Assembly constituencies of Madhya Pradesh